ICI-204,448 is a drug which acts as a potent and peripherally selective κ-opioid agonist, with possible uses in the treatment of heart attack as well as anti-itching effects. It is used in research to distinguish centrally from peripherally mediated kappa opioid receptor effects.

References

Synthetic opioids
Chloroarenes
Acetamides
Pyrrolidines
Kappa-opioid receptor agonists
Phenol ethers
Acetic acids
Peripherally selective drugs